The Berliner-Joyce XF3J was an American biplane fighter, built by Berliner-Joyce Aircraft. It was submitted to the United States Navy for their request for a single-seat carrier-based fighter powered by a  Wright R-1510-26 engine.

Development and design
The XF3J had elliptical fabric covered wings which gave it the appearance of a butterfly. The fuselage was semimonocoque metallic with an aluminum skin. The undercarriage was fixed, and would be the last biplane fighter without a retractable gear that the U.S. Navy would test. The aircraft performed satisfactorily in testing, but more promising aircraft had been developed and, in September 1935, the program was terminated.

Specifications (XF3J)

References

Citations

Bibliography

F3J
1930s United States fighter aircraft
Single-engined tractor aircraft
Biplanes
Carrier-based aircraft
Aircraft first flown in 1934